Giovanni Lopez de Andrade, O.S.A. or Diego Lopez de Andrade (1569–1628) was a Roman Catholic prelate who served as Archbishop of Otranto (1623–1628).

Biography
Giovanni Lopez de Andrade was born in Azambuja, Portugal in 1569 and ordained a priest in the Order of Saint Augustine.
On 20 November 1623, he was appointed during the papacy of Pope Paul V as Archbishop of Otranto.
On 30 November 1623, he was consecrated bishop by Giovanni Garzia Mellini, Cardinal-Priest of Santi Quattro Coronati with Niceforo Melisseno Comneno, Bishop of Crotone, and Alessandro Bosco, Bishop of Gerace, serving as co-consecrators. 
He served as Archbishop of Otranto until his death on 22 August 1628.

References 

17th-century Italian Roman Catholic archbishops
Bishops appointed by Pope Paul V
1569 births
1628 deaths
People from Lisbon District